Dahlman is a surname of Swedish origin. Notable people with the surname include:

Albert Gustaf Dahlman (1848–1920), Swedish executioner
Hjalmar Reinhold Dahlman (1909-1993), Canadian politician
James Dahlman (1856–1930), American politician
Jenni Dahlman (born 1981), Finnish model
Nanne Dahlman (born 1970), Finnish tennis player
Noah Dahlman (born 1989),  American basketball player
Toni Dahlman (born 1979), Finnish ice hockey player

See also
Dahlman neighborhood, Omaha, Nebraska, US
Dahlmann, a surname